Focus.com was a business focused social networking platform and source of technology expertise. By September 2010, it comprised over 850,000 Members and 5,000 Business Experts.  Focus members could freely access expert research in diverse areas such as Information Technology, Sales, Marketing, Operations, Small Business, and Human Resources. Members also could get their business questions answered by experts in the community in the site's Q & A and Virtual Summit sections.

The company was founded in August 2005 by Scott Albro and was headquartered in San Francisco, California.

The company was purchased by Ziff Davis, Inc. in August 2011 and its location at Focus.com has since been terminated.

See also

LinkedIn Answers
Quora
Toolbox.com

References

External links
 

American social networking websites
Companies based in San Francisco
Internet properties established in 2005
2005 establishments in California